U.S. Air Force rank insignia can refer to:

United States Air Force enlisted rank insignia
United States Air Force officer rank insignia